Kovanlı, formerly and still informally called Zambır, is a village in the Oğuzeli District, Gaziantep Province, Turkey. The village is inhabited by Turkmens of the Barak tribe.

References

Villages in Oğuzeli District